Operation Zahnarzt (literally "Operation Dentist") was a plan by the Germans to eliminate the Third Army during World War II. By 21 December 1944, the German momentum during the Battle of the Bulge had begun to dissipate. The plan for Operation Zahnarzt was to immediately follow Operation Nordwind. The plan was to initiate a pincer movement to encircle and destroy the 3rd US Army. 

The German offensive began in the immediate aftermath of Operation Nordwind. The intention of the operation was to trap and destroy Lieutenant General George S. Patton's US 3rd Army. Preliminary and small-scale attacks began shortly before and during Operation Nordwind which began on January 1, 1945. In the days that followed, the Germans saw their small advances continually eroded by repeated counterstrikes from Major General Robert L. Spragin's US 44th Infantry Division, Major General Withers A. Burress's US 100th Infantry Division, and Major General Lewis E. Hibbs's US 63rd Infantry Division. They were supported by the French 2nd Armored Division. Allied artillery and air attacks (when the weather broke), together with the harshness of the weather, also diminished the momentum of the Germans by cutting off their already-thin supply lines. Thus, the Germans were forced to call off the operation on January 4. Zahnarzt was one of the last planned major offensives by the Germans during the war.

References

Battle of the Bulge